Hanham Athletic Football Club is a football club based in England that play in the Gloucestershire County League Premier Division. They played in the FA Cup in the 1940s and 1950s, as well as the FA Vase during the 1970s.

Records
FA Cup
Second Qualifying Round 1948–49
FA Vase
Second Round 1975–76

References

External links

Football clubs in England
Western Football League
Gloucestershire County Football League
Mining association football teams in England
Association football clubs established in 1896